William McLean Clunas (29 April 1899 – 1 September 1967) was a Scottish footballer who played for Sunderland and the Scottish national team, primarily in the right half position. He was born in Johnstone, Scotland.

Club career
Clunas made his debut for Sunderland on 1 December 1923 against Huddersfield Town in a 2–1 win at Roker Park. Former Sunderland captain Raich Carter hailed Clunas as the best penalty kick taker he had ever seen; Clunas only missed two in his whole career, scoring 26. Overall, during his time at Roker Park, he made 256 league appearances and scored 42 goals, and also played 16 times in the FA Cup, scoring twice.

International career
He won his first cap for Scotland against England on 12 April 1924 in a 1–1 draw at The Wembley Stadium. In total Clunas won two caps for his country, scoring one goal. He scored the third goal in a 3–0 win against Wales on 31 October 1925.

See also
One-club man

References

External links
William Clunas's careers stats at The Stat Cat

1899 births
1967 deaths
Scottish footballers
Scotland international footballers
Sunderland A.F.C. players
Association football wing halves
English Football League players
People from Johnstone
Greenock Morton F.C. players
St Mirren F.C. players
Blackpool F.C. non-playing staff